Statistics from the 2015 Curaçao Sekshon Pagá:

Table

Regular season

Kaya 6

Kaya 4

Championship match

See also 
 Curaçao League First Division

References

External links
 Main Results

2015
1
1